The TX-0, for Transistorized Experimental computer zero, but affectionately referred to as tixo (pronounced "tix oh"), was an early fully transistorized computer and contained a then-huge 64K of 18-bit words of magnetic-core memory. Construction of the TX-0 began in 1955 and ended in 1956. It was used continually through the 1960s at MIT. The TX-0 incorporated around 3,600 Philco high-frequency surface-barrier transistors, the first transistor suitable for high-speed computers. The TX-0 and its direct descendant, the original PDP-1, were platforms for pioneering computer research and the development of what would later be called computer "hacker" culture. For MIT, this was the first computer to provide a System console which allowed 
for direct interaction, as opposed to previous computers, which required the use of Punched card as a primary interface for programmers debugging their programs. 
Members of MIT's Tech Model Railroad Club, "the very first hackers at MIT",  reveled in the interactivity afforded 
by the console, and were recruited by Marvin Minsky to work on this and other systems used by Minsky's AI group.

Background
Designed at the MIT Lincoln Laboratory largely as an experiment in transistorized design and the construction of very large core memory systems, the TX-0 was essentially a transistorized version of the equally famous Whirlwind, also built at Lincoln Lab. While the Whirlwind filled an entire floor of a large building, TX-0 fit in a single reasonably sized room and yet was somewhat faster. Like the Whirlwind, the TX-0 was equipped with a vector display system, consisting of a 12" oscilloscope with a working area of 7 by 7 inches connected to the 18-bit output register of the computer, allowing it to display points and vectors with a resolution up to 512×512 screen locations.

The TX-0 was an 18-bit computer with a 16-bit address range. First two bits of machine word designate instruction and remaining 16 bits are used to specify memory location or operand for special "operate" instruction. First two bits could create four possible instructions, which included store, add, and conditional branch instructions as a basic set. The fourth instruction, "operate", took additional operands and allowed access to a number of "micro-orders" which could be used separately or together to provide many other useful instructions. An "add" instruction took 10 microseconds.

Wesley A. Clark designed the logic and Ken Olsen oversaw the engineering development.

Development
Initially a vacuum-tube computer named TX-1 was being designed to test the first large magnetic-core memory bank.  However, the design was never approved and the TX-1 was never built.  Instead, the TX-0 was designed for the same purpose, except using transistors. With the successful completion of the TX-0, work turned immediately to the much larger and far more complex TX-2, completed in 1958. Since core memory was very expensive at the time, several parts of the TX-0 memory were cannibalized for the TX-2 project.

After a time, the TX-0 was no longer considered worth keeping at Lincoln Lab, and was "loaned" (semi-permanently) to the MIT Research Laboratory of Electronics (RLE) in July 1958, where it became a centerpiece of research that would eventually evolve into the MIT Artificial Intelligence Lab and the original computer hacker culture. Delivered from Lincoln Laboratory with only 4K of core, the machine no longer needed 16 bits to represent a storage address. After about a year and a half, the number of instruction bits was doubled to four, allowing a total of 16 instructions, and an index register was added. This dramatically improved programmability of the machine, but still left room for a later memory expansion to 8K (the four instruction bits and one-bit indexing flag left 13 bits for addressing). This newly modified TX-0 was used to develop a huge number of advances in computing, including speech and handwriting recognition, as well as the tools needed to work on such projects, including text editors and debuggers.

Meanwhile the TX-2 project was running into difficulties of its own, and several team members decided to leave the project at Lincoln Lab and start their own company - Digital Equipment Corporation (DEC).

Legacy
After a short time selling "lab modules" in the form of simple logic elements from the TX-2 design, the newly formed Digital Equipment Corporation (DEC) decided to produce a "cleaned up" TX-0 design, and delivered it in 1961 as the PDP-1. A year later, DEC donated the engineering prototype PDP-1 machine to MIT. It was installed in the room next to TX-0, and the two machines would run side-by-side for almost a decade.

Significant pieces of the TX-0 are held by MIT Lincoln Laboratory.  In 1983, the TX-0 was still running and is shown running a maze application in the first episode of Computer Chronicles.

As part of its use in artificial intelligence research, the computer was used to write simple western playlets and was featured in the 1961 CBS television documentary "The Thinking Machine", and in the companion book by John Pfeiffer of the same title published by the JB Lippincott  Company in 1962.

See also
 Expensive Desk Calculator
 Expensive Tape Recorder
 Early history of video games — early video games invented on the TX-0

References

External links
 RLE Technical Report 627 TX-0 Computer History (Oct 1974)
 Oral history interview with Jack B. Dennis, Charles Babbage Institute, University of Minnesota. — Dennis describes his educational background and work in time-sharing computer systems at the Massachusetts Institute of Technology (MIT), including the TX-0 computer, the work of John McCarthy on time-sharing, and the development of Multics at General Electric.
 The TX-0: Its Past and Present
 TX-0 documentation
 TX-0 programs
 Steven Levy, Hackers: Heroes of the Computer Revolution
  — Website dedicated to information about the TX-0 computer. [Website partially working when checked]
 

One-of-a-kind computers
Transistorized computers
18-bit computers